This articles lists Wikipedia articles about members of the Manitoba Co-operative Commonwealth Federation (CCF), a social democratic political party in Manitoba, Canada, and its successor, the Manitoba New Democratic Party (NDP).

List by date of election

Elected before 1936

John Queen; Winnipeg  1920-1922 (Social Democratic Party) 1922-1927 (Independent Workers), 1927-1932-1936 (Independent Labour), 1936-1941 (CCF) (ran, CCF lost), former Mayor of Winnipeg
William Ivens; Winnipeg  1920-1922 (Dominion Labour Party), 1922-1927-1932-1936 (Independent Labour), 1936 (ran as CCF, lost)
Seymour Farmer; Winnipeg  1922-1927-1932-1936 (Independent Labour),1936-1941-1945-1949 (CCF) (retired, Ridings Boundaries Changed)
Harold Lawrence; St. Boniface 1932-1936 (Independent Labour), 1936-1941 (CCF)
Marcus Hyman; Winnipeg 1932-1936 (Independent Labour), 1936-1938 (CCF) (died)

1936 general election
The CCF won a total of seven seats in the 1936 general election. Four CCF MLAs had previously sat as Independent Labour MLAs, three CCFers were elected for the first time:

James Aiken - Assiniboia 1936-1941
Herbert Sulkers - St. Clements 1936-1941  (ran, CCF lost)
Joseph Wawrykow - Gimli 1936-1941-1945 (retired, CCF lost)

1941 general election
The CCF won three seats in the 1941 election.
Morris Gray - Winnipeg 1941-1945-1949, Winnipeg North 1949-1953-1958, Inkster 1958-1959-1962-1966 (retired, NDP won)

1943 by-elections 
The CCF won two additional seats in by-elections in 1943:
Beresford Richards - The Pas 1943by-1945-1949  (*kicked out CCF for Communist leanings, but let back in 1945, kicked out again in 1949, CCF lost)
Dwight Johnson - Brandon 1943by-1945  (*kicked out of the CCF, CCF lost)

1945 general election
The CCF won nine seats in the 1945 election.
Ernest Draffin - Assiniboia 1945-1949 (ran, CCF lost)
Michael Sawchuk - Ethelbert 1945-1949 (did not run, CCF lost)
Edwin Hansford - St. Boniface 1945-1949-1953  (retired, CCF lost)
Wilbert Doneleyko - St. Clements 1945-1949  (kicked out of the CCF, CCF lost)
George Olive - Springfield 1945-1949, Kildonan-Transcona 1949-1953 (retired, CCF won)
Lloyd Stinson - Winnipeg 1945-1949, Winnipeg South(4) 1949-1953-1958, Osborne 1958-1959  (ran, CCF lost)
Donovan Swailes - Winnipeg 1945-1949-1953, Winnipeg Centre 1953-1958, Assiniboia 1958-1959 (ran, CCF lost)

1949 general election
The CCF won seven seats in the 1949 election.
Gordon Fines - Winnipeg 1949-1953  (ran, CCF lost)
John Hawryluk - Winnipeg North 1949-1953-1958, Burrows 1958-1959-1962  (ran, NDP lost)

1953 general election
The CCF won five seats in the 1953 election.
A. Russell Paulley - Kildonan-Transcona 1953-1958, Radisson 1958-1959-1966-1969, Transcona 1969-1973-1977

1958 general election
The CCF won eleven seats in the 1958 election.
Edward Schreyer Brokenhead 1958-1959-1962-1965by (ran federally, NDP won), Rossmere 1969-1973-1977-1979by (retired, NDP won)
Steve Peters - Elmwood 1958-1959-1962-1966 (retired, NDP won)
Peter Wagner - Fisher 1958-1959-1962  (ran, vote was rigged, NDP lost)
A.J. Reid - Kildonan 1958-1959-1962 (retired, NDP won)
David Orlikow  - St. Johns 1958-1959-1962 (ran federally, NDP won)
Arthur E. Wright - Seven Oaks 1958-1962-1966  (retired, NDP won)

1959 general election
The CCF won ten seats in the 1959 election.
Lemuel Harris - Logan 1959-1962-1966-1969 (retired, NDP won)

1962 general election
The NDP won seven of the 57 seats available in the 1958 election.
Saul Cherniack - St. John's  1962-1966-1969-1973-1977-1981 (retired, NDP won)

1966 general election
The NDP won eleven of the 57 seats available in the 1966 election.
Sam Uskiw - Brokenhead  1966-1969, Lac Du Bonnet 1969-1973-1977-1981-1986 (retired, NDP won)
Ben Hanuschak - Burrows  1966-1969-1973-1977-1981*  (quit NDP, sat as Independent)
Russell Doern - Elmwood  1966-1969-1973-1977-1981-1984*  (quit NDP, sat as Independent)
Michael Kawchuk - Ethelbert Plains  1966-1969 (ran in Roblin, lost)
Sidney Green - Inkster  1966-1969-1973-1977-1979* (quit NDP, sat as Independent)
Peter Fox - Kildonan 1966-1969-1973-1977, Concordia 1981-1986 (retired, NDP won)
Saul Miller - Seven Oaks  1966-1969-1973-1977-1981 (retired, NDP won)
Philip Petursson - Wellington  1966-1969-1973-1977 (retired, NDP won)

1969 by-election 
The NDP won one additional seat in a by-election in 1969:
Joseph Borowski - Churchill  1969by-1969, Thompson 1969-1972 (quit NDP, sat as Independent, NDP won riding in 1972)

1969 general election
The NDP won 28 of the 57 seats available in the 1969 election, forming a minority government under Edward Schreyer.
Leonard Evans - Brandon East  1969-1973-1977-1981-1986-1988-1990-1995-1999 (retired, NDP won)
Cy Gonick - Crescentwood  1969-1973 (retired, NDP won)
Peter Burtniak - Dauphin  1969-1973-1977 (ran, NDP lost)
Thomas Barrow - Flin Flon  1969-1973-1977-1981 (retired, NDP won)
John Gottfried - Gimli  1969-1973-1977 (retired, NDP lost)
William Jenkins - Logan  1969-1973-1977-1981 (retired, NDP won)
Ian Turnbull - Osborne  1969-1973-1977 (ran, NDP lost)
Donald Malinowski - Point Douglas  1969-1973-1977-1981, St Johns 1981-1986 (retired, NDP won)
Harry Shafransky - Radisson  1969-1973-1977 (ran, NDP lost)
Jean Allard - Churchill  1969-1972 (quit NDP, sat as Independent)
Bill Uruski - St. George  1969-1973-1977-1981, Interlake 1981-1986-1988-1990 (retired, NDP won)
Al Mackling  - St. James  1969-1973  (ran, NDP lost)  1981-1986-1988 (retired, NDP lost)
Wally Johannson - St. Matthews  1969-1973-1977 (ran, NDP lost)
Howard Pawley - Selkirk  1969-1973-1977-1981-1986-1988 (retired, NDP lost)
Rene Toupin - Springfield  1969-1973-1977 (ran, NDP lost)
Ron McBryde - the Pas  1969-1973-1977-1981 (retired, NDP won)
Bud Boyce - Winnipeg Centre  1969-1973-1977-1981  (quit NDP to sit as an independent)

1971 by-elections 
The NDP won two additional seats in by-elections in 1971, and a third when a former Liberal crossed the floor, allowing its minority government to become a majority:
Jim Walding - St. Vital  1971by-1973-1977-1981-1986-1988 (voted against NDP, causing NDP government to fall)
Aime R. Pete Adam - Ste. Rose  1971by-1973-1977-1981-1986 (retired, NDP lost)
Laurent Desjardins - St. Boniface  (Liberal MLA from 1959-1962-1966-1969-1971) crossed floor to join NDP 1971-1973* (lost election by 1 vote, Election Declared Void, Won in 1974) 1974-1977-1981-1986-1988  (retired, NDP lost)

Jean René Allard, a former Liberal candidate who joined the NDP in 1969, left the NDP to sit as an Independent on April 7, 1972, and subsequently ran in the 1974 federal election as a Liberal. Joseph Borowski left the NDP caucus on June 25, 1972, reducing the NDP to a minority government. He ran as an Independent in 1972 and was defeated by the NDP.

1973 general election
The NDP won 31 of the 57 seats available in the 1973 election and formed a majority government.
Les Osland - Churchill  1973-1977 (retired, NDP won)
Harvey Patterson  - Crescentwood  1973-1977 (retired, NDP lost)
Steve Derewianchuk  - Emerson  1973-1977 (ran, NDP lost)
Harvey Bostrom - Rupertsland  1973-1977-1981 (retired, NDP won)
Ken Dillen - Thompson  1973-1977 (ran, NDP lost)

1977 general election
The NDP won 23 of the 57 seats available in the 1977 election, resulting in the NDP losing government. Three new NDP MLAs were elected:
Jay Cowan - Churchill  1977-1981-1986-1988-1990 (retired, riding eliminated)
Wilson Parasiuk - Transcona  1977-1981-1986-1988 (ran, NDP lost)
Brian Corrin - Wellington  1977-1981, Ellice 1981-1986 (retired, NDP won)

1979 by-election 
The NDP won one additional seat in a by-elections in 1979:
Victor Schroeder - Rossmere  1979by-1981-1986-1988 (ran, NDP lost)

1981 general election
The NDP won 34 of the 57 seats available in the 1981 election, forming a government under Howard Pawley.
Henry Carroll - Brandon West  1981-1982 (quit NDP, sat as Independent)
Conrad Santos - Burrows  1981-1986-1988, Broadway 1990-1995-1999, Wellington 1999-2003–2007 (quit NDP in 2007, ran as in Independent and was defeated, NDP won)
John Plohman - Dauphin  1981-1986-1988-1990-1995 (retired, NDP won)
Jerry Storie - Flin Flon  1981-1986-1988-1990-1994 (retired, no byelection held)
Roland Penner - Fort Rogue  1981-1986-1988 (ran, NDP lost)
John Bucklaschuk - Gimli  1981-1986-1988 (ran, NDP lost)
Don Scott - Inkster  1981-1986-1988 (ran, NDP lost)
Mary Beth Dolin - Kildonan  1981-1985by (died, NDP won)
Maureen Hemphill - Logan  1981-1986-1988-1990 (retired, riding boundaries realigned)
Muriel Smith - Osborne  1981-1986-1988 (ran, NDP lost)
Gerard Lecuyer - Radisson  1981-1986-1988 (ran, NDP lost)
Doreen Dodick - Riel  1981-1986 (ran, NDP lost)
Phil Eyler  - River East  1981-1986 (ran, NDP lost)
Elijah Harper - Rupertsland  1981-1986-1988-1990-1993by (ran federally for Liberals)
Eugene Kostyra - Seven Oaks  1981-1986-1988 (ran, NDP lost)
Andy Anstett - Springfield  1981-1986 (ran, NDP lost)
Harry Harapiak - the Pas  1981-1986-1988-1990 (retired, NDP won)
Steve Ashton - Thompson 1981-1986-1988-1990-1995-1999-2003–2007-2011-2016 (defeated 2016)
Myrna Phillips - Wolseley  1981-1986-1988 (ran, NDP lost)

1985 by-election
The NDP won one additional seat in a by-elections in 1985:
Martin Dolin - Kildonan  1985by-1986-1988 (ran, NDP lost)

1986 general election
The NDP government of Howard Pawley was re-elected, winning 30 of the 57 seats available in the 1986 election, a loss of four seats. Despite having a majority, the government was defeated in the legislature in 1988 due to the retirement of Laurent Desjardins and backbench NDP MLA Jim Walding voting against the budget, causing the government to fall in 1988.
Gary Doer NDP leader (1988-2009), Premier of Manitoba (1999-2009) - Concordia  1986-1988-1990-1995-1999-2003–2007-2009 (retired 2009, NDP hold)
Harvey Smith - Ellice  1986-1988  (ran, NDP lost)
Jim Maloway - Elmwood  1986-1988-1990-1995-1999-2003-2008 (res. to run federally, NDP won)
Clarence Baker - Lac Du Bonnet  1986-1988 (ran, NDP lost)
Judy Wasylycia-Leis - St. Johns  1986-1988-1990-1993 (resigned 2003 to run federally, NDP won)
Leonard Harapiak - Swan River  1986-1988 (ran, NDP lost)

1988 general election
The NDP government was defeated and fell to third place in the legislature with only twelve of the 57 seats available in the 1988 election, a loss of 18 seats.

1990 general election
The NDP won twenty of the 57 seats available in the 1990 election.
Doug Martindale - Burrows 1990-1995-1999-2003–2007-2011 (retired 2011, NDP hold)
Clif Evans - Interlake  1990-1995-1999 (retired, NDP hold)
Dave Chomiak - Kildonan  1990-1995-1999-2003–2007-2011-2016 (ran 2016, NDP lost)
George Hickes - Point Douglas  1990-1995-1999-2003–2007-2011 (retired 2011, NDP hold)
Marianne Cerilli - Radisson 1990-1995-1999-2003 (retired, NDP hold)
Gregory Dewar - Selkirk  1990-1995-1999-2003–2007-2011-2016 (ran 2016, NDP lost)
Rosann Wowchuk - Swan River 1990-1995-1999-2003–2007-2011 (retired 2011, NDP hold)
Oscar Lathlin - the Pas  1990-1995-1999-2003-2008 (died, NDP hold in byelection)
Daryl Reid - Transcona  1990-1995-1999-2003–2007-2011-2016 (retired 2016, NDP lost)
Becky Barrett - Wellington 1990-1995-1999, Inkster 1999-2003 (retired, NDP lost)
Jean Friesen - Wolseley  1990-1995-1999-2003 (retired, NDP won)

1993 by-elections 
The NDP won one additional seat and retained two seats in by-elections in 1993:
Eric Robinson - Rupertsland  1993by-1995-1999-2003–2007-2011-2016 (ran 2016, NDP lost)
Gord Mackintosh - St.Johns 1993by-1995-1999-2003–2007-2011-2016 (retired 2016, NDP hold)

1995 general election
The NDP won 23 of the 57 seats available in the 1995 election.
Tim Sale - Crescentwood  1995-1999, Fort Rogue 1999-2007
Stan Struthers - Dauphin 1995-1999, Dauphin-Roblin 1999-2003–2007 Dauphin 2011-2016 (retired 2016, NDP lost)
Gerard Jennissen - Flin Flon 1995-1999-2003–2007-2011 (retired 2011, NDP hold)
Diane McGifford - Osborne 1995-1999, Lord Roberts 1999-2003–2007-2011 (retired 2011, riding dissolved)
MaryAnn Mihychuk - St. James 1995-1999, Minto 1999-2003-2004by  (retired 2004, NDP won byelection)

1999 general election
The NDP won 32 of the 57 seats available in the 1999 election, forming a government under Gary Doer.
Jim Rondeau - Assiniboia  1999-2003–2007-2011-2016 (retired 2016, NDP lost)
Drew Caldwell - Brandon East  1999-2003–2007-2011-2016 (ran 2016, NDP lost)
Scott Smith - Brandon West  1999-2007 (ran 2007, NDP lost)
Tom Nevakshonoff - Interlake  1999-2003–2007-2011-2016 (ran 2016, NDP lost)
Ron Lemieux - La Verendrye  1999-2003–2007-2011 Dawson Trail 2011-2016 (retired 2016, NDP lost)
Linda Asper - Riel  1999-2003* (resigned to move to Europe, NDP held)
Greg Selinger NDP leader and Premier of Manitoba (2009-2016) - St. Boniface  1999-2003–2007-2011-2016-2018 (retired 2018, NDP lost)
Bonnie Korzeniowski - St. James 1999-2003–2007-2011 (retired 2011, NDP hold)
Nancy Allan - St. Vital 1999-2003–2007-2011-2016 (retired 2016, NDP lost)
Cris Aglugub - the Maples  1999-2007 (retired 2017, NDP hold)

2003 general election
The NDP government was re-elected, winning 35 of the 57 seats available in the 2003 election, a gain of three seats.
Kerri Irvin-Ross - Fort Garry  2003–2007-2011 Fort Richmond 2011-2016 (ran 2016, NDP lost)
Peter Bjornson - Gimli 2003–2007-2011-2015 (retired 2015, NDP lost)
Bidhu Jha - Radisson  2003–2007-2011-2016 (retired 2016, NDP lost)
Christine Melnick - Riel 2003–2007-2011-2016 (ran 2016, NDP lost)
Marilyn Brick - St. Norbert  2003–2007-2011 (retired 2011, NDP hold)
Theresa Oswald - Seine River 2003–2007-2011-2016 (retired 2016, NDP lost)
Rob Altemeyer - Wolseley 2003–2007-2011-2016-2019 (retired 2019, NDP hold)

2004 by-election 
The NDP retained one seat in a by-election in 2004:
Andrew Swan - Minto  2004–2007-2011-2016-2019 (retired 2019, riding dissolved)

2007 election
The NDP won 36 of 57 seats in the 2007 Manitoba general election, a gain of one seat. 
Erin Selby - Southdale 2007-2011-2015 (resigned 2015 to run federally, NDP lost)
Flor Marcelino - Wellington 2007–2011 Logan 2011-2016-2019 (retired 2019, riding dissolved)
Jennifer Howard - Fort Rouge 2007–2011-2016 (retired 2016, NDP hold)
Erna Braun- Rossmere 2007–2011-2016 (ran 2016, NDP lost)
Mohinder Saran - The Maples 2007–2011-2016-2019 (expelled from NDP in 2017 and sat as Independent, retired 2019, NDP hold)
Sharon Blady - Kirkfield Park 2007–2011-2016 (ran 2016, NDP lost)

2009 by-elections
The NDP retained two seats
Bill Blaikie - Elmwood 2009–2011 (retired 2011, NDP hold)
Frank Whitehead - The Pas 2009–2011-2014 (retired 2014, NDP by-election hold)

2010 by-election
The NDP retained one seat:
Matt Wiebe - Concordia 2010by-2011-2016-2019-present

2011 election
The NDP government of Greg Selinger, who had succeeded Gary Doer in 2009, won 37 out of 57 seats, gaining 1 seat. Eight new NDP MLAs were elected: 
Clarence Pettersen - Flin Flon 2011-2016 (lost NDP nomination in 2015, ran as an Independent, NDP hold)
Melanie Wight - Burrows  2011-2016 (ran 2016, NDP lost)
Kevin Chief - Point Douglas 2011-2016-2017 (resigned 2017, NDP by-election hold)
Ted Marcelino - Tyndall Park 2011-2016-2019 (ran 2019, NDP lost)
Jim Maloway - Elmwood 2011-2016-2019-present
Deanne Crothers - St. James 2011-2016 (ran 2016, NDP lost)
James Allum - Fort Garry-Riverview 2011-2016-2019 (retired 2019, riding dissolved)
Dave Gaudreau - St. Norbert 2011-2016 (ran 2016, NDP lost)

2015 by-election
The NDP retained one seat. 
Amanda Lathlin - The Pas 2015by-2016-2019 The Pas-Kameesak 2019-present

2016 election
The NDP government of Greg Selinger was defeated. The NDP won 14 seats out of 57, a loss of 21 seats. Three new NDP MLAs were elected:
Tom Lindsey - Flin Flon 2016-2019-present
Nahanni Fontaine - St. Johns 2016-2019-present 
Wab Kinew, NDP leader (2017-present) - Fort Rouge 2016-2019-present

2017 by-election
The NDP retained one seat.
Bernadette Smith - Point Douglas 2017by-2019-present

2019 election
The NDP under Wab Kinew won 18 seats out of 57, a gain of six seats. 11 new NDP MLAs were elected:

Ian Bushie - Keewatinook 2019-present
Danielle Adams - Thompson 2019-2021 (died in traffic accident, NDP hold in byelection)
Diljeet Brar - Burrows 2019-present
Mintu Sandhu - The Maples 2019-present
Nello Altomare - Transcona 2019-present
Adrien Sala - St. James 2019-present
Mark Wasyliw - Fort Garry 2019-present
Malaya Marcelino - Notre Dame 2019-present
Uzoma Asagwara - Union Station 2019-present
Lisa Naylor - Wolseley 2019-present
Jamie Moses - St. Vital 2019-present

2022 by-election
The NDP retained one seat.
Eric Redhead - Thompson 2022by-present

Articles on prominent NDPers/CCFers at the municipal level
William Barlow (mayor) - Former Mayor of Gimli
Errol Black - Brandon City Councillor
Rick Boychuk - Former Winnipeg City Councillor
Ross Eadie - Winnipeg City Councillor
Magnus Eliason - Former Winnipeg City Councillor, Founding Member of the CCF and the NDP
Duane Nicol - Selkirk City Councillor
Harvey Smith - Winnipeg City Councillor, Daniel McIntyre Ward
Lillian Thomas - Deputy Mayor of Winnipeg

Articles on prominent Manitoba CCF/NDP members and organizers
Magnus Eliason - co-founder CCF, long time Winnipeg City Councillor

See also
List of articles about CCF/NDP members
List of articles about British Columbia CCF/NDP members
List of articles about Alberta CCF/NDP members
List of articles about Saskatchewan CCF/NDP members
List of articles about Ontario CCF/NDP members
List of articles about Nova Scotia CCF/NDP members
List of articles about Yukon NDP members

Lists of Canadian politicians
CCF/NDP members
CCF/NDP members